Tricholosporum longicystidiosum is a species of fungus in the family Tricholomataceae. Found in Mexico, it was described as new to science in 1990.

References

External links

longicystidiosum
Fungi of North America
Fungi described in 1990